Gaussian distribution on a locally compact Abelian group is a distribution  on a second
countable locally compact Abelian group  which satisfies the
conditions:

(i)  is an infinitely divisible distribution;

(ii) if   , where   is the  generalized
Poisson distribution, associated  with a finite measure , and
 is an infinitely divisible distribution, then the measure 
is degenerated at zero.

This definition of the Gaussian distribution for the group
  coincides with the classical one.  The support of

Let  be the character group of the group . A distribution
characteristic function can be represented in the form

,

where  is the
value of a character  at an element , and
 is a continuous nonnegative function on  satisfying
the equation .

A Gaussian distribution  is called symmetric if . Denote by
 the set of Gaussian distributions on the group , and by  the set of symmetric  Gaussian distribution on
.  If ,   then  is a continuous
homomorphic image of a Gaussian distribution in a real linear space.
This space is either   finite dimensional or infinite dimensional
(the space of all sequences of  real numbers in the product
topology).

If a distribution  can be embedded in a continuous
one-parameter semigroup , of distributions on
, then  if and only if

 for any neighbourhood of zero
 in the group .

Let  be a connected group, and
.  If  is not a locally connected, then
 is singular (with respect of a Haar distribution on )
().   If  is a locally connected and has a finite
dimension, then  is either absolutely continuous or
singular. The question of the validity of a similar statement on
locally connected groups of infinite dimension is open, although on
such groups it is possible to construct both absolutely continuous
and singular Gaussian distributions.

It is well known that two Gaussian distributions in a linear space
are either mutually absolutely continuous or mutually singular. This
alternative is true for Gaussian distributions on connected groups
of finite dimension .

The following theorem is valid, which can be considered
as an analogue of Cramer's theorem on the decomposition of the normal distribution for locally compact Abelian groups.

Cramer's theorem on the decomposition of the Gaussian distribution for locally compact Abelian groups 

Let  be a   random variable   with values in a locally compact
Abelian group  with a Gaussian distribution, and  let
and only if the group  contains no subgroup topologically
isomorphic to the circle group, i.e. the multiplicative group of
complex numbers whose modulus is equal to 1.

References 

Probability distributions